The Royal Rumble match is a professional wrestling match based on the classic Battle Royal match in which a number of wrestlers (traditionally 30) aim at eliminating their competitors by tossing them over the top rope, with both feet touching the floor. The match is typically the main event of WWE's January pay-per-view event known as the Royal Rumble. The winner of the event is the last wrestler remaining after all others have been eliminated. Stone Cold Steve Austin holds the record for victories with three, achieved in 1997, 1998, and 2001, while Hulk Hogan, Shawn Michaels, John Cena, Batista, Triple H, Randy Orton, Edge, and Brock Lesnar have all won the match twice. The match has been won from the number 1 position on four occasions, by Shawn Michaels in 1995, Chris Benoit in 2004, by Edge in 2021, and Rhea Ripley in 2023.

Concept
The Royal Rumble differs from the classical battle royal as the contestants do not enter the ring at the same time, but instead are assigned entry numbers, usually via a lottery, although desirable spots are occasionally assigned by other means, the most common being winning a match. The match begins with the two wrestlers who have drawn entry numbers one and two, with the remaining wrestlers entering the ring at regular timed intervals, either 90 seconds or two minutes, according to their entry number. This format is credited to Pat Patterson. To date, only six wrestlers who have been one of the starting two entrants have won the Royal Rumble: Shawn Michaels in 1995, Vince McMahon in 1999, Chris Benoit in 2004, Rey Mysterio in 2006, Edge in 2021, and Rhea Ripley in 2023. (Michaels, Benoit, Edge, and Ripley were entrant number 1 while McMahon and Mysterio were number 2), while only five wrestlers who have been the final entrant won the Royal Rumble: The Undertaker in 2007, John Cena in 2008, Triple H in 2016, Brock Lesnar in 2022, and Cody Rhodes in 2023. The most common number to win is 30, and 16 eventual winners entered at number 25 or later.

The Royal Rumble match traditionally involves 30 wrestlers and usually lasts an hour (the 2011 edition had a 40-man field). The Greatest Royal Rumble (the only edition to have a 50-man field) was the longest, lasting one hour and 17 minutes of a five-hour pay-per-view event while the first televised Rumble match in 1988 involved only 20 men and lasted 33 minutes of the two-hour broadcast. The 1998 match nominally had the traditional 30-man field, but only 28 individual wrestlers competed as Mick Foley entered the Royal Rumble match three different times as three different gimmicks—first as Cactus Jack, then Mankind and finally Dude Love. The 2018 Royal Rumble PPV was the first to include a women's Royal Rumble match, contested under the same rules as the men's match, including having 30 participants.

According to the rules, participants are eliminated from the match if moved over the top rope and both feet touch the floor. Hence, a wrestler who exits the ring without going over the top rope is not eliminated from the contest. For example, during the 1999 match, both McMahon and Stone Cold Steve Austin left the ring only to return later in the match. Furthermore, a wrestler who only touches the floor with one foot is not eliminated from the match, a rule which greatly affected the 1995 match, allowing Michaels to re-enter the ring and win the match. Although he has not won a Royal Rumble match, Kofi Kingston has become synonymous with finding various ways to keep at least one of his feet from touching the floor. In the 1994 match, the last two participants (Bret Hart and Lex Luger) were declared co-winners when officials were unable to determine whose feet touched the floor first. Although this was the intended outcome, a similar situation occurred by a legitimate accident in 2005, when Batista and Cena eliminated each other and hit the ground at exactly the same time. This time, the match was restarted. Though various referees are charged with observing the match, some eliminations have gone unnoticed to allow the eliminated participants to sneak back into the ring to continue. Austin was able to re-enter the ring in this way and win the 1997 match.

Although eliminations are usually caused by active participants, eliminations caused by other means have been ruled legitimate, including self-eliminations (such as Andre the Giant after seeing a snake in 1989, Mil Mascaras diving out of the ring from the turnbuckle in 1997 and Kane in 1999, although Randy Savage's jump over the top rope in 1992 was not ruled as self-elimination), elimination by previously eliminated participants (such as The Undertaker eliminating Maven in 2002, Kurt Angle eliminating Michaels in 2005 or Sonya Deville eliminating Naomi in 2022) or non-participants (such as Shane McMahon eliminating Shawn Michaels in 2006 and The Miz eliminating John Cena in 2011). Furthermore, an injured wrestler can return to the ring as long as the match is still ongoing (such as Austin in 1999, Roman Reigns in 2016, and Randy Orton in 2021), but not if the match has already ended (such as Spike Dudley in 2004 and Scotty 2 Hotty in 2005) and can also be replaced by another wrestler (such as Mick Foley replacing Test in 2004, Sami Zayn replacing Tye Dillinger in 2018, and Nia Jax replacing R-Truth in 2019).

Prize
Since 1993, the winner of the Royal Rumble match is traditionally awarded a title match for WWE's top championship at WrestleMania—WWE currently promotes two main roster brands with a top championship for each and the winner can choose which championship to challenge for, regardless of the brand they belong to. For the men, that is the WWE Championship on Raw, the WWE Universal Championship on SmackDown. Similarly, the winner of the women's Royal Rumble match (first contested in 2018) is awarded a match at WrestleMania for their choice of one of WWE's top women's championships: the WWE Raw Women's Championship, or WWE SmackDown Women's Championship.

With the first brand extension introduced in mid-2002, the 30 male entrants from 2003 to 2006 consisted of 15 wrestlers from the Raw and SmackDown brands, respectively. At first, the winner of the match received a shot for their brand's top championship, either the World Heavyweight Championship or WWE Championship. Starting in 2004, the Royal Rumble winner had the option of challenging for either brand's top championship. For instance, Chris Benoit switched from SmackDown to Raw after winning the 2004 event to challenge for Raw's top championship at the time. From 2007 to 2010, participants from the ECW brand competed along with the Raw and SmackDown brands, with the ECW Championship added as an option, although no winner ever chose it. During ECW's participation, the entries for each brand were not evenly divided. The ECW Championship was deactivated in 2010, leaving the two remaining titles until they were unified in December 2013 as the WWE World Heavyweight Championship. This singular option lasted until the brand extensions' return in 2016, which introduced the Universal Championship, as the WWE World Heavyweight Championship reverted to being called the WWE Championship. Like the first brand extension, the winner of the 2017 event earned a match for their brand's top championship, the Universal Championship or WWE Championship, but beginning with the 2018 event, the winner has a choice. NXT - WWE's developmental brand - was elevated to rain roster status from September 2019 until September 2021, during that time NXT's top championships (the NXT Championship for men and the NXT Women's Championship for women) were also eligible choices.  This ended when NXT reverted back to developmental status in September 2021.  Since the return of the brand extension, the number of participants from each brand has not been evenly divided, as matches have also featured NXT wrestlers, as well has surprise entrants such as WWE Hall of Famers and/or debuting wrestlers.

WWE's top championship has been booked as on the line during the Royal Rumble match on two occasions. In 1992, the vacant WWF World Heavyweight Championship was contested in the Royal Rumble match, which was won by Ric Flair, while in 2016, Roman Reigns was scheduled to defend his WWE World Heavyweight Championship as a participant of that year's Royal Rumble match as entrant number one. This has thus far been the only time that a reigning champion had to defend his title in the match, which was ultimately won by Triple H, who eliminated Reigns before lastly eliminating Dean Ambrose to win; Reigns would earn a rematch against Triple H at WrestleMania 32 and won back the title. In 2008, although he did not defend his title in the match, ECW Champion Chavo Guerrero entered the Royal Rumble match as entrant number 26 before being eliminated by eventual winner John Cena. This was the first time in which a reigning world champion competed in the match in which the winner could challenge them. In 2020, although he did not defend his title in the match, WWE Champion Brock Lesnar entered the Royal Rumble match as entrant number 1, feeling as if no one on any brand deserved to challenge him at either the Royal Rumble or WrestleMania. Lesnar's participation was used as a way to set up his WrestleMania challenger, which ended up being Drew McIntyre, who eliminated Lesnar, won the Rumble match and then challenged Lesnar for his title at WrestleMania 36. In 2022, although she did not defend her title in the match, SmackDown Women's Champion Charlotte Flair entered the Royal Rumble match as entrant number 17, feeling as if no one on any brand deserved to challenge her at either the Royal Rumble or WrestleMania. This was the first time in which a reigning women's champion competed in the match in which the champion could choose their opponent; Flair's participation was used as a way to set up her WrestleMania challenger, which ended up being Ronda Rousey, who eliminated Flair, won the Rumble match and then challenged Flair for her title at WrestleMania 38.

The Royal Rumble winner may also choose to put his championship opportunity on the line in a match. This was first done in 1996, when Shawn Michaels risked his WrestleMania XII WWF World Heavyweight Championship opportunity in a match against Owen Hart at In Your House 6. The second time was in 2002, when Triple H lost his WrestleMania X8 Undisputed WWF Championship opportunity at No Way Out to Kurt Angle, but regained his spot in a rematch against Angle on the following Raw. The third time was in 2006, when Randy Orton defeated Rey Mysterio at No Way Out for Mysterio's WrestleMania 22 World Heavyweight Championship opportunity, though Mysterio was reinserted into the title match, making it a triple threat match. The fourth time was on the February 25, 2013 edition of Raw, where John Cena successfully defended his WrestleMania 29 WWE Championship opportunity in a match against CM Punk. The fifth time was in 2015 at Fastlane, where Reigns defended his WrestleMania 31 WWE World Heavyweight Championship opportunity against Daniel Bryan. In a reverse case in 2008, John Cena decided that instead of waiting until WrestleMania XXIV, he would use his world championship opportunity and challenge WWE Champion Orton at the preceding No Way Out event, though won the match but not the title when Orton intentionally got himself disqualified; however, after Triple H became Orton's WrestleMania opponent, Cena earned another opportunity and was inserted into that championship match, making it a triple threat match. In another case in 2017, Randy Orton relinquished his WrestleMania 33 WWE Championship opportunity after his stablemate Bray Wyatt won the title, but later turned on Wyatt and reverted his decision; he then defeated AJ Styles, who had become the new title challenger, to re-earn his title shot at WrestleMania.

During the Greatest Royal Rumble in April 2018, the winner Braun Strowman received a trophy and the Greatest Royal Rumble Championship.

Dates, venues, and winners

Male Royal Rumble winner's championship opportunity 

 – WrestleMania victory
 – WrestleMania loss
 – Did not receive title match 

No WrestleMania title opportunity was awarded in the 2016 Royal Rumble match as the WWE World Heavyweight Championship itself, then held by Roman Reigns, was at stake. Triple H won the Royal Rumble match, and Reigns regained the championship in a rematch at WrestleMania 32.

Female Royal Rumble winner's championship opportunity 

 – WrestleMania victory
 – WrestleMania loss

Royal Rumble records

Men's Royal Rumble

Most victories

Winners by entry number

Longest time spent in a single Royal Rumble 

Bold indicates the winner of that year's match.

(*) - Gunther is credited as the record holder in traditional 30-man Rumble matches with his time of 1:11:40.  Daniel Bryan's time of 1:16:05 was set in a 50-man Rumble.

Longest cumulative time

Shortest time spent in a single Royal Rumble

Most eliminations in a single Royal Rumble 

Bold indicates the winner of that year's match.

Most consecutive eliminations 

Bold indicates the winner of that year's match.

Total eliminations

Highest number of wrestlers in a single elimination

Most Rumble appearances

Wrestlers who have competed multiple times in the same night 
These wrestlers have competed more than once in either the same Rumble match or multiple Rumble matches in the same night; Foley entered the same match three times under different personas, whereas Jax competed in both the Women's and Men's Royal Rumble matches.

Female entrants in male Royal Rumble matches

Women's Royal Rumble

Most victories

Winners by entry number

Longest time spent in a single Royal Rumble 

Bold indicates the winner of that year's match.

Longest cumulative time

Shortest time spent in a single Royal Rumble

Most eliminations in a single Royal Rumble 

Bold indicates the winner of that year's match.

Most appearances

Highest number of wrestlers in a single elimination 
Highest number of wrestlers working together to eliminate one wrestler

Total cumulative eliminations

Male entrants in female Royal Rumble matches

Other Royal Rumble matches 
WWE has also booked several Royal Rumble matches outside of pay-per-view events:
 The very first Royal Rumble match took place at a house show in St. Louis, Missouri on October 4, 1987, where the One Man Gang won a 12-Man Royal Rumble, last eliminating the Junkyard Dog, to earn a WWF World Heavyweight Championship match against Hulk Hogan at the following month's St. Louis house show.
A 22-man Royal Rumble match took place at a house show in East Rutherford, New Jersey on March 14, 1988 where Jake Roberts was the winner. 
 A 22-man Royal Rumble match took place at a house show in Hartford, Connecticut on March 16, 1988, where Ravishing Rick Rude was the winner.
 A 30-man Royal Rumble on January 17, 1994, at Madison Square Garden was won by Owen Hart, last eliminating Fatu.
 An 18-man Royal Rumble match took place on May 9, 1994, in Osaka, Japan and was won by The Undertaker, last eliminating Bam Bam Bigelow.
 There was a tag team Royal Rumble on the June 15, 1998 episode of Raw. Kane and Mankind won the match and earned an opportunity for the WWF Tag Team Championship against The New Age Outlaws.
 On January 11, 1999, a "corporate Royal Rumble" involving members of The Corporation and D-Generation X was held on Raw to determine the 30th entry in the Royal Rumble that year. The match was won by Chyna, who last eliminated Vince McMahon.
A 5-man Royal Rumble took place on the September 16, 1999 episode of SmackDown to crown a contender for Triple H's WWF Championship later that night.
A 4-man Royal Rumble took place on the January 8, 2004 episode of SmackDown, when Paul Heyman pit Chris Benoit against the three members of the F.B.I.
 A 15-man Royal Rumble was held during the January 29, 2004 episode of SmackDown to crown a contender for Brock Lesnar's WWE Championship at No Way Out. Eddie Guerrero won the match, last eliminating Kurt Angle.
A 7-man Royal Rumble took place on the January 22, 2007 episode of Raw. However instead of entrants coming out to timed intervals, Jonathan Coachman called each entrant out at his own discretion.
 On January 14, 2008, Vince McMahon organized a mini-Royal Rumble, involving The Great Khali and midget wrestlers. Hornswoggle won the match.
A 4-man Royal Rumble took place on the January 28, 2011 episode of SmackDown as Alberto Del Rio competed in the "Royal Rumble Exhibition" match. The match ended in a no contest, marking the only time a Royal Rumble match to end in a no contest.
 On the January 31, 2011, episode of Raw, a Royal Rumble to crown the contender for The Miz's WWE Championship at Elimination Chamber was held. Jerry Lawler won the match, last eliminating Sheamus.
In 2017, the female wrestlers of NXT held a Halloween Royal Rumble during as a house show event. Shayna Baszler, as Darth Baszler, won the match.
 At the 2018 Royal Rumble, WWE aired an advert for KFC in the form of a 9-man "KFC Colonel Rumble," segments of which had been filmed as a dark match at a SmackDown taping two weeks prior. Ric Flair won the version that was aired, last eliminating The Miz.
In 2018, the male wrestlers of NXT held a costumed Halloween Royal Rumble during a house show to crown a contender for Ricochet's NXT North American Championship, which was won by Stacey Ervin Jr..
In 2019, NXT held two costumed Halloween Royal Rumbles during a house show. The women's match was won by Shayna Baszler and the men's match was won by Bronson Reed.

References 

WWE match types